The Second Fayyad Government or the Palestinian Government of May 2009 was a Palestinian government of the Palestinian National Authority led by Salam Fayyad from 19 May 2009 to June 2013. Fayyad had been Prime Minister of the First Fayyad Government of June 2007. The government comprised 20 ministers.

The Fayyad Government was the de jure government in the Palestinian Authority, though its control was confined to the West Bank Areas A and B, whereas Hamas formed the de facto Government in the Gaza Strip.

In 2013, the Fayyad government was succeeded by the Palestinian governments of 2013 led by Rami Hamdallah.

Powers and jurisdiction
Pursuant to the Oslo Accords, the authority of the PA Government was limited to some civil rights of the Palestinians in the West Bank Areas A and B and in the Gaza Strip, and to internal security in Area A and in Gaza.

The Fayyad Government was the de jure government in the Palestinian Authority, though its control was confined to the West Bank Areas A and B, while Hamas formed the de facto Government in the Gaza Strip.

Formation 

Most of the ministers were members of Fatah, although the Cabinet also included independents and members of third parties.

The Government was appointed by presidential decree and lacked the approval of the Palestinian Legislative Council as required pursuant the Palestinian Basic Law. The opposition of the Hamas majority alone was enough to withhold the new government its legal basis, but even Fatah's parliamentary bloc did not endorse the government. Two PLC members refused to join the government when the Fatah bloc decided not to back the new Fayyad cabinet. For the international community, this was not a reason to question the legality of the Government.

Members of the Government 

May 2009 to June 2013

See also

Palestinian government

References

Palestinian National Authority governments
Cabinets disestablished in 2012
Cabinets established in 2009
2009 establishments in the Palestinian territories
2012 disestablishments in the Palestinian territories